The 2011–12 Czech Cup was the nineteenth season of the annual football knock-out tournament of the Czech Republic. The draw for the whole competition was made on 8 July 2011. It began on 24 July 2011 with the Preliminary Round and was due to conclude with the final on 16 May 2012, however due to the Czech Republic's qualification for UEFA Euro 2012, the final was brought forward to 2 May 2012. The winners of the competition qualified for the third qualifying round of the 2012–13 UEFA Europa League.

Teams

Preliminary round
The Preliminary round was played on 24 July 2011.

|}

First round
The First round was played on the weekend of 30 and 31 July 2011.

|}

Second round
Teams from the Czech First League entered at this stage. The second round was played on 10 August 2011.

|}

Third round
The third round was played on 31 August 2011.

|}

Fourth round
The fourth round was played on 21 September and 19 October 2011.

|}

Quarter-finals
The quarter-finals were played on 21 and 28 March 2012.

|}

Semi-finals
The semi finals were played on 11 and 18 April 2012.

|}

Final
The final was held on 2 May 2012 at Stadion města Plzně.

See also
 2011–12 Czech First League
 2011–12 Czech 2. Liga

References

External links
 Official site 
 soccerway.com

2011-12
2011–12 domestic association football cups
2011–12 in Czech football